Dominik Ivilin Yankov (born 28 July 2000) is a professional footballer who plays as a midfielder for Ludogorets Razgrad. Born in Canada, he represents Bulgaria on international level.

Yankov played in the Power FC Soccer Academy in Toronto until age 13, when joined Sunderland's Academy. Three years later he moved to Bulgaria, joining Ludogorets, where he made his senior debut.

Career

Ludogorets Razgrad

Academy and second team
Before joining Ludogorets, Yankov spent 5 years playing for Power FC, a private Canadian academy. After that he moved to Sunderland where he spent 3 years, but after his parents decided to return to Bulgaria, they chose the Ludogorets academy as the best place for him to continue his career.

Yankov made his debut in the UEFA Youth League for Ludogorets on 27 September 2017 in the first round of Domestic champions path against Željezničar Sarajevo.

On 27 May 2017, in the last league match of the season, Yankov was set on bench in the match against Spartak Pleven, but remained on bench the whole match. He completed his debut for the doubles on 13 August 2017 in a league match against Nesebar.

First team

In February 2018 Ludogorets manager Dimitar Dimitrov took Yankov in the first team. Yankov made an unofficial debut for the team in a winter break friendly against the Romanian club Botoșani. He completed his debut for the team on 12 May 2018 in a league match against Levski Sofia.

Loan to Botev Vratsa
On 1 August 2019 Yankov was sent on loan to the fellow First League team Botev Vratsa until end of the year with an option to extend the loan until the end of the season. He made his debut for the team three days later in a league match against CSKA Sofia, coming on as a substitute in the 84th minute. In his first match as a starter on 16 August against Slavia Sofia, Yankov scored his first goal for the team and also assisted another.

Return to Ludogorets
After his successful spell in Botev, Ludogorets coach Pavel Vrba decided to include Yankov in the first team. He returned in play in the Supercup match against Lokomotiv Plovdiv on 2 August. On 19 August he compleated his debut in the Champions League match against FK Budućnost Podgorica. On 25 August, before the Champions League match against FC Midtjylland, he tested positive for COVID-19. He returned in play on 12 September 2020, scoring his debut league goal and helping his team to a win over Lokomotiv Plovdiv. On 24 September 2020 he signed a new long-term contract with the team.

International career
Yankov was born in Canada to Bulgarian parents, which makes him eligible for both Canada and Bulgaria national teams.
He represented Canada U15, but later represented Bulgaria on U17, U19 and U21 levels although he received several invites for Canada's youth teams, including a call for the U23 for the 2020 CONCACAF Olympic qualifying. In an interview in June 2020 he explained that he would represent the country that contacts him first. In October 2020 he was called for Bulgaria U21 team, but after an injury of Borislav Tsonev, Yankov received his first call up for the senior team of Bulgaria, declaring he will represent the nation on international level. He completed his debut on 8 October in the UEFA Euro 2020 Play-off match against Hungary, coming as a substitute in the 79th minute. In 2021  he was recalled for the U21 team of Bulgaria for the friendly tournament Antalya Cup, where he was named the team captain. Bulgarian team finished as a runner-up, losing the final game against North Macedonia U21. Yankov scored 2 goals and was named as the best midfielder.

Career statistics

Club

International

Honours

Club

Ludogorets
First Professional Football League (4): 2017–18, 2018–19, 2020-21, 2021–22
Bulgarian Supercup (3): 2019, 2021, 2022

Individual
Best Progressing Player in the Bulgarian First League: 2020

References

Power FC

External links
 

2000 births
Living people
Soccer players from Toronto
Association football midfielders
Bulgarian footballers
Bulgaria youth international footballers
Bulgaria under-21 international footballers
Bulgaria international footballers
Canadian soccer players
Canadian people of Bulgarian descent
FC Botev Vratsa players
PFC Ludogorets Razgrad II players
PFC Ludogorets Razgrad players
First Professional Football League (Bulgaria) players
Second Professional Football League (Bulgaria) players